Jacobus "Jackie" Pretorius (22 November 1934 – 30 March 2009) was a racing driver from South Africa. He participated in four Formula One World Championship Grands Prix, debuting on 1 January 1965, and scoring no championship points.

Pretorius competed in Formula One at national level in his home country of South Africa, enjoying some success throughout the late 1960s and early 1970s. After racing a Lotus and a Lola, he won two races in 1971 driving a Brabham.

Jackie Pretorius died in Johannesburg aged 74, on 30 March 2009, after being in a coma for three weeks. He was attacked in his home early on a Friday morning by burglars. His wife Shirley died in a similar incident in the same house several years earlier.

Complete Formula One World Championship results
(key)

References
 "The Grand Prix Who's Who", Steve Small, 1995.

1934 births
2009 deaths
People from Potchefstroom
Afrikaner people
South African Formula One drivers
People murdered in Johannesburg
South African murder victims
South African people of Dutch descent
South African racing drivers
LDS Formula One drivers
Team Gunston Formula One drivers
Williams Formula One drivers
2009 murders in South Africa